Terri Janke is an Indigenous Australian lawyer of Wuthathi/Meriam heritage. She is considered a leading international authority on Indigenous cultural and intellectual property (ICIP), and is the Solicitor Director of Terri Janke and Company.

Early life and education 
Terri Janke was born in Cairns in Queensland, Australia, with Torres Strait Islander (Mer Island) and Aboriginal (Wuthathi) heritage, from Cape York Peninsula in North Queensland.

She graduated from the University of New South Wales (BA LLB) in 1995.

In 2019, Janke completed a PhD thesis at the Australian National University, entitled True Tracks: Indigenous Culture and Intellectual Property Principles for putting self-determination into Practice. She is also a graduate of the Australian Institute of Company Directors and LEADR Mediators. In 2021, Janke published a book based on her PhD entitled True Tracks: Respecting Indigenous Knowledge and Culture. The book is a resource for respecting Indigenous knowledge and culture, which draws on 20 years of her work on the True Tracks principles.

Career
Janke has worked at the National Indigenous Arts Advocacy Association, where she assisted the legal team in the leading case Milpurrurru v Indofurn. Janke has also completed work as a legal consultant with the World Intellectual Property Organisation (WIPO) on the Pacific Traditional Knowledge Action Plan.

Janke is the Solicitor Director of Terri Janke and Company, her wholly Indigenous-owned legal firm founded in 2000. Terri Janke and Company specialises in Indigenous intellectual property, Indigenous cultural and intellectual property and business law, and is the largest and oldest Indigenous law firm in Australia.

Janke is respected as one of Australia's leading Indigenous lawyers, and is also considered an expert and international authority on Indigenous cultural and intellectual property (ICIP). She has written the leading protocols ICIP models for various industries including film, arts, museum and archival sectors.

Janke has served on the boards of many Indigenous and non-Indigenous organisations and associations, with some of her previous positions including deputy chair of the National Centre of Indigenous Excellence (Deputy Chair), Tourism Australia, National Indigenous Television (Chair) and Ngalaya Indigenous Lawyers Association (Chair), as well as at the State Library of NSW.

Recognition 
 2007: Highly Commended, Law and Justice Foundation of NSW Aboriginal Justice Award
2008: invited by the Prime Minister of Australiato be a delegate at the Australia 2020 Summit
2011: NAIDOC Indigenous Person of the Year
 2012:Australian Attorney-General's Indigenous Legal Professional of the Year, 2012
 2013: Westpac/Australian Financial Review 100 Women of Influence
 2015: Finalist, Telstra NSW Business Women's Awards
 Finalist, Indigenous Business, Ethnic Business Awards, 2015
 Finalist, NSW Regional Business Awards, City of Sydney, 2018
 Community Lawyer of the Year, Women Lawyers Association of NSW, 2019
 Indigenous Business Leader of the Year, MyBusiness Awards, 2019
J.G. Crawford Prize at ANU, 2020, for her PhD thesis, True Tracks: Indigenous Culture and Intellectual Property Principles for putting self-determination into Practice
Shortlisted, New South Wales Premier's Literary Awards Indigenous Writers' Prize for True Tracks

Selected publications 
Alongside the leading ICIP protocols and models in various sectors, Janke has many publications on the effect of the law on Indigenous peoples and culture, many of which are commissioned by both government and non-government organisations and institutions.

Papers, reports and books

 Janke, Terri, True Tracks: Respecting Indigenous knowledge and culture (NewSouth, 2021)
 Janke, Terri, True Tracks: Indigenous cultural and intellectual property principles for putting self-determination into practice (Thesis (PhD), 2019)
Janke, Terri and Maiko Sentina, ‘Indigenous Knowledge: Issues for protection and management’ (Discussion Paper, IP Australia & Department of Industry, Innovation and Science, 2018).
 Janke, Terri and Sarah Grant, First Peoples: A Roadmap for Enhancing Indigenous Engagement in Museums and Galleries (Australian Museums and Galleries Association, 2018).
 Janke, Terri and Maiko Sentina, Indigenous Joint Ventures Information Guide (Indigenous Business Australia, 6 April 2018).
 Janke, Terri and Lucinda Edwards, Indigenous cultural rights and engagement policy (National Museum of Australia, 2015).
 Terri Janke and Company, Law Way: Indigenous Business and the Law (2013).
 Janke, Terri, The Mabo Oration 2011: Follow the stars: Indigenous culture, knowledge and intellectual property rights (Anti-Discrimination Commission Queensland, 2011).
 Janke, Terri, Pathways & Protocols: A filmmaker’s guide to working with Indigenous people, culture and concepts (Screen Australia, 2009).
 Janke, Terri, Beyond Guarding Ground: a Vision for a National Indigenous Cultural Authority (Terri Janke and Company, 2009).
 Janke, Terri, Code of Practice for Galleries and Retailers of Indigenous Art (City of Melbourne, 2007).
 Terri Janke and Company, Protocols for Working with Indigenous Artists (Australia Council for the Arts, 2007).
 Jenke, Terri, Butterfly Song (Penguin Australia, 2005)
 Janke, Terri, Minding Culture: Case Studies on Intellectual Property and Traditional Cultural Expressions (World Intellectual Property Organisation, 2003).
 Mellor, Doreen and Terri Janke, Valuing Art, Respecting Culture – Protocols for Working with the Indigenous Visual Arts and Craft Sector (National Association for the Visual Arts, 2001).
 Janke, Terri, Our Culture: Our Future – Report on Australian Indigenous Cultural and Intellectual Property Rights (Report commissioned by the Australian Institute of Aboriginal and Torres Strait Islander Studies, Michael Frankel & Company, 1998).

Journal articles and chapters in books

 Janke, Terri, 'The Streets of My Youth' (2018), Growing Up Aboriginal In Australia 
Janke, Terri, ‘Protecting Indigenous Cultural Expressions in Australia and New Zealand: Two Decades After the Mataatua Declaration and Our Culture, Our Future’ (2018) 114 Intellectual Property Forum 21–30.
 Janke, Terri, ‘From smokebush to spinifex: Towards recognition of Indigenous knowledge in the commercialisation of plants’ (2018) 1 International Journal of Rural Law and Policy 1-27.
 Janke, Terri, ‘Ensuring Ethical Collaborations in Indigenous Arts and Records Management’ (2017) 91(5) Australian Law Journal 375-380.
 Janke, Terri, ‘Guarding ground: A vision for a national Indigenous cultural authority’ in Robert Tonkinson (ed), The Wentworth Lectures: Honouring fifty years of Australian Indigenous Studies (Aboriginal Studies Press, 2015) 258–280.
 Janke, Terri and Sarah Holcombe, ‘Patenting the Kakadu Plum and the Marjarla Tree: Biodiscovery, intellectual Property and Indigenous Knowledge’ in Matthew Rimmer and Alison McLennan (eds), Intellectual Property and Emerging Technologies: The New Biology (Edward Elgar, 2012) 293-319.
 Janke, Terri, ‘Copyright, Connections and Culture: Is there a place in the Australian arts industry for a National Indigenous Cultural Authority?’ in Courageous Conversations (Wilin Centre for Indigenous Arts and Cultural Development, 2010) 11-16.
 Janke, Terri, ‘Looking Out for Culture: Indigenous arts and cultural expression and copyright, trademarks and designs’ (2004) 26 Ngoonjook: Journal of Australian Indigenous Issues 73.
 Janke, Terri, ‘Respecting Indigenous Cultural and Intellectual Property Rights’ (1999) 22(2) University of New South Wales Law Journal 631.

References 

Year of birth missing (living people)
Living people
Torres Strait Islanders
University of New South Wales alumni
Australian National University alumni
21st-century Australian lawyers
Australian women lawyers
People from Cairns
21st-century women lawyers